The Cypress Mine is a proposed extension to the open cast coal mine the Stockton Mine’s operational area, to the east into the Upper Waimangaroa Mining Permit area, on the West Coast of New Zealand.

In 2005, Solid Energy, a state owned enterprise owned by the New Zealand government, was granted resource consent for the mine after an unsuccessful appeal to the Environment Court.

Save Happy Valley Coalition (SHVC), an environmental organisation, opposed the mine and occupied land adjacent to the proposed mine site for two years. SHVC say that the mine will cause acid mine drainage, destruction of habitat of endangered species and result in 12 to 14 million tonnes of CO2 emissions, contributing to climate change.

Solid Energy's Environmental Report 2007 stated that the mine is planned to start in 2008. Solid Energy has stated that the mine will be developed in 2010 and that the first coal is expected to be taken in late 2011.

In October 2012 Solid Energy announced that work on the mine would be delayed.

On 12 June 2013, The Biodiversity Defence Society filed proceedings with the Environment Court, arguing that Solid Energy no longer holds resource consents for its Cypress Mine, due to the expiry of the allocated time period of the consent.

References

External links
Solid Energy
Save Happy Valley Coalition

Coal mines in New Zealand
Environmental issues in New Zealand
Surface mines in New Zealand
Environmental protests in New Zealand